Michael Lodahl is a theologian in the Church of the Nazarene. He graduated from Northwest Nazarene College in 1977, graduated summa cum laude from Nazarene Theological Seminary in 1981, and earned a Ph.D. from Emory University. He has pastored one church, La Puente Church of the Nazarene from 1981–1984, held professorship at Northwest Nazarene University, and currently teaches at Point Loma Nazarene University. He has published over 10 books, some of them held in many libraries.   His best-known literary work is Story of God. His most widely held book is Shekhinah/spirit : divine presence in Jewish and Christian religion, published by   Paulist Press in 1992, and held in 292 worldCat libraries.

Publications
 Praying with Jesus: Meditations on the Lord's Prayer (Foundry Press, 2022)
 Matthew Matters: The Yoke of Wisdom and the Church of Tomorrow (Cascade, 2021)
 Renewal in Love: Living Holy Lives in God's Good Creation (Beacon Hill, 2014)
 Claiming Abraham: Reading the Bible and the Qur'an Side by Side (Brazos Press, 2010)
 When Love Bends Down: Images of the Christ Who Meets Us Where We Are (Beacon Hill Press, 2006)
 Relational Holiness: Responding to the Call of Love (Beacon Hill Press, 2005)
 God of Nature and of Grace: Reading the World in a Wesleyan Way (Abingdon Press, 2004)
 All Things Necessary to Our Salvation: The Hermeneutical and Theological Implications of the Article on the Holy Scriptures in the Manual of the Church of the Nazarene (Point Loma Press, 2004)
 Embodied Holiness: A Corporate Theology of Spiritual Growth (InterVarsity Press, 1999)
 The Story of God: Wesleyan Theology & Biblical Narrative (Beacon Hill Press, 1994)
 Shekinah/Spirit: Divine Presence in Jewish and Christian Religion (Paulist Press, 1992)

References

 

Nazarene theologians
American theologians
Year of birth missing (living people)
Living people
Emory University alumni
Northwest Nazarene University alumni
American Nazarene ministers
Point Loma Nazarene University faculty
Nazarene Theological Seminary alumni